Richard Belmont (born ) was an English cricketer. He was a right-handed batsman and a right-arm medium-fast bowler who played for Norfolk. He was born in Dronfield, Derbyshire.

Belmont, who represented the team in the Minor Counties Championship in 1988 and the Holt Cup in 1991, made his sole List A appearance for the side in the 1991 NatWest Trophy. Belmont scored 9 runs in the match, and took figures of 1-53 from 13 overs of bowling.

External links
Richard Belmont at CricketArchive 

1965 births
Living people
English cricketers
Norfolk cricketers
People from Dronfield
Cricketers from Derbyshire